Olivibacter sitiensis is a gram-negative, aerobic, non-spore-forming, rod-shaped and non-motile bacterium from the genus of Olivibacter that has been isolated from alkaline olive-oil mill wastes on Sitia on Crete. Olivibacter sitiensis has the ability to degrade diphenol.

References

Further reading

External links
Type strain of Olivibacter sitiensis at BacDive -  the Bacterial Diversity Metadatabase

Sphingobacteriia
Bacteria described in 2007